2012 IFA Shield began on 3 March 2012. Pune FC along with six other I-League teams participated in the 116th edition. Brazilian Série A famous team Botafogo came here to participate in the 116th edition of the Shield.

Groups
In Group 'A', East Bengal will with Shillong Lajong FC and Bhowanipur SC :: In Gr. "B" Brazilian side Botafogo with Chirag United Kerala and Southern Samity :: In Gr. 'C' Pune FC with Pailan Arrows and Ar-Hima Club and in Gr. ' D ' Prayag United with Mumbai FC and Aryan club.

Results

Pune FC were held by minnows Pailan Arrows, while Southern Samity stunned I-League side United Kerala. East Bengal pip Bhawanipore FC 2–1 in the 116th IFA Shield opener at the Yuba Bharati Krirangan in Kolkata.

Pune FC Won 3–0 over Ar Hima FC. East Bengal won the trophy by pipping Prayag united by 4-2 via a tie-breaker.

References

IFA Shield seasons
2011–12 in Indian football